Melania Carolina Hotu Hey (born 8 February 1959) is a Rapa Nui Chilean politician. She has served as the provincial governor of Easter Island (known locally as Rapa Nui or as Isla de Pascua in Spanish), in Chilean Polynesia, in the first and second governments of Michelle Bachelet.

Political career 
She was appointed on March 11, 2006 by newly elected Chilean President Michelle Bachelet Jeria as part of the President's undertaking to increase female representation in governmental positions. Before beginning her term as local governor (suerekao), Hotu Hey directed a program for Rapa Nui youth.

Significant issues facing Easter Island during her term included Chilean immigration, loss of culture, and political reform aimed at providing greater autonomy.  Tensions over similar issues led to the resignation of Governor Pedro Edmunds Paoa, Hotu Hey's predecessor, in 2010.

In September 2015 she was appointed governor of Easter Island for the second time office she held until 16 March 2018.

References

1959 births
Living people
Governors of provinces of Chile
Rapanui politicians
Easter Island people
Women governors of provinces of Chile